Identity is an American game show, created by Tim Puntillo, and produced by Reveille Productions for NBC. Hosted by magician Penn Jillette (of Penn & Teller), with narrations by Joe Cipriano, the format focuses on contestants working out which facts are linked to one of 12 strangers in each episodes, through visual observations and deductions, with correct matches increasing the prize money they can walk away  up to a jackpot of $500,000 for matching all identities. Contestants have access to lifelines, denoted as "helps", which can assist at times, and may also ask questions to some of the strangers at various points during the game show.

Identity ran for only one season, beginning strongly with its premiere on December 18, 2006, before ratings declined over the course of its broadcast until its final episode on April 27, 2007. Despite plans to air a second season, NBC chose not to commission further episodes, though the format was later leased to other countries including France, Russia and the United Kingdom.

Format 
In each episode, a contestant is introduced to 12 different strangers each standing on number podiums, before being given a list of 12 "identities"  each is a fact pertaining to each stranger, regarding elements such as occupations, hobbies, height or weight, age, and so forth, some of which can allude to multiple strangers. The contestants task is to try to deduce which stranger corresponds to each fact, sometimes through visual observations, and at certain points, through asking questions about the stranger's background. The strangers may provide their first name, either at the beginning or during the course of the episode, and are often dressed in misleading outfits to disguise their identity. During the course of the game show, contestants can sometimes be aided with opinions from close friends and family members attending their participation.

If a contestant decides to link a fact to a stranger, they must "seal the identity" with their own podium, to which the host Jillette will then ask that stranger if this is their identity. A correct match will increase the prize money the contestant earns, as listed in the table below:

At any point during the game, the contestant may choose to quit the game with the winnings won up to that point. However, while the contestant can make one mistake with an identity (dubbed the "Mistaken Identity" help, which may not be used once the contestant reaches $250,000 with two identities remaining), a second mistake will lose them the game and leave them with no prize. At times, the contestant can rely on two lifelines (denoted as "helps") to aid them:

 Tri-dentity: A chosen identity is narrowed down to three strangers, to which the contestant must correctly match the identity to one of these three (or quit the game) and cannot pick another identity until then. This help is only active until there is just four strangers remaining.
 Ask The Experts: Contestants may ask a panel of three experts to give them informed opinions on which stranger can be matched to a chosen identity. These experts have no inside knowledge of the strangers and can only rely on their professional training and experience to make educated guesses. The contestant is not bound to relying on their opinions and can chose another identity to work on if unsure. This help is available at any point in the game.

Other helps

In addition to the three explained helps, there are several other points of assistance offered to the contestant:
 During Identity’s premiere week, Jillette would ask the contestant which stranger he or she wanted to know more about. He would then ask that stranger their first name and several pieces of information which are not directly related to any of the identities, such as whether they had any pets. When Identity debuted as a weekly series, this was formalized: at the beginning of the game, the contestant may ask for the first names and a biographical fact about three of the twelve strangers. After the third correct match, the contestant could ask about two of the remaining nine strangers, and after the sixth match, may ask about one of the remaining six.
 After the fourth correct match, Jillette would introduce the contestant's friends and/or family members. The friends and family typically have a suggestion prepared as to the identity of one of the strangers after they are introduced. However, the friends or family members may sometimes lead a person to match an identity to the wrong stranger or take the money when they would have won the grand prize.
 The audience is not obligated to remain silent until an identity is sealed. The audience often voices their opinion on a selection. Occasionally when a contestant fails to recognize a celebrity of some sort and tries to select him or her for the wrong identity, the audience can dissuade the contestant with their reaction.
 Jillette himself, particularly on early identities, has shown apparent intention on warning, or hinting at the contestants when they are making a blatantly-erroneous selection, though he also sometimes is prevented from doing so by a contestant's quick sealing of an identity.

Identities and strangers
The 12 strangers stand on individually numbered podiums and are referred to mainly by number, though names are often revealed in the progress of the show.

Usually at least one identity is made blatantly obvious from physical appearance alone (blatant examples include a "Sumo wrestler" in fighting garb, and a "George W. Bush impersonator"). Celebrity strangers may be easily recognizable by the contestant or the contestant's friends (once they are allowed to help). There were no intentionally misleading costumes (e.g., a physicist dressed as a sumo wrestler when both "physicist" and "sumo wrestler" were possible identities), although strangers often break stereotypes (e.g., a female prison guard, a goateed, long-haired nuclear physicist wearing a leather jacket, or a preschool teacher dressed in a bikini). There was even a missionary wearing a bikini in one episode.

Strangers have confirmed their identities in a variety of ways; musicians, for example, have been handed instruments and asked to play if they can (similarly, opera singer Jennifer Wallace revealed her identity by holding a very high note). Some "skill" identities have been confirmed by demonstration; for example, a go-go dancer danced on stage. Sometimes strangers perform from their podiums, while others are brought to the front of the main stage. Other strangers confirm their identities with a remark which pertains to their identity. An NFL player hesitated and then signaled "It's good" with his hands signaling a field goal, while a mall Santa laughed "ho ho ho". Most follow their comment up with "Yes, I am [the identity]" (though the audience reaction often masks this), and some strangers say only that.

In cases where the stranger is prepared to demonstrate his or her identity, but the contestant selects the wrong stranger for that identity, the mistaken stranger will be asked to try to demonstrate that identity, only to refuse at the last moment and confirm he is not that identity. Strangers that were prepared to demonstrate their identity but were not given the opportunity (the player loses or quits the game) may be asked to demonstrate this when the full answers are revealed to the player.

Interactive game 
During the program's broadcast in December 2006, Identity was accompanied by an interactive game, in a similar arrangement to other NBC game shows such as Deal or No Deal and 1 vs. 100. Designed as an at-home game open to residents of the continental United States called "The Identity Challenge", players who participated were chosen at random and could win won $10,000 by choosing which of five strangers represents a product, or a profession related to the advertised product.

On the first two nights, three of the five were revealed to be incorrect throughout the game, and the answer was revealed before the final commercial break. On the next three, there was no such narrowing; all five strangers remained throughout the show. To encourage viewers to watch television commercials during the show, the correct answer to the "Identity Challenge" question was revealed during a related commercial within the first 20 minutes of the show. The interactive feature was later dropped before the program's sixth episode on March 16, 2007.

Ratings and episode air dates

International versions

References

External links 
 
 
 Identity Singapore

NBC original programming
2000s American game shows
2006 American television series debuts
2007 American television series endings
Television series by Reveille Productions